The Yellowstone Plateau Volcanic Field, also known as the Yellowstone Supervolcano or the Yellowstone Volcano, is a complex volcano, volcanic plateau and volcanic field located mostly in the western U.S. state of Wyoming but also stretches into Idaho and Montana. It is a popular site for tourists.

The plateau developed through three volcanic cycles spanning two million years that included some of the world's largest known eruptions. Activity subsequently shifted to the present Yellowstone Plateau and culminated 630,000 years ago with the eruption of the > Lava Creek Tuff and the formation of the present  caldera. Resurgent doming then occurred at both the NE and SW sides of the caldera and voluminous  intracaldera rhyolitic lava flows were erupted between 150,000 and 70,000 years ago. Phreatic eruptions produced local tephras during the early Holocene. The caldera presently contains one of the world's largest hydrothermal systems including the world's largest concentration of geysers. Much of the plateau is located within Yellowstone National Park.

References

Landforms of Yellowstone National Park
Volcanic plateaus
Geology of Wyoming
Plateaus of the United States
Volcanic fields of Wyoming
Complex volcanoes
Supervolcanoes